Dejan Meleg (born 1 October 1994) is a Serbian professional footballer who plays as a attacking midfielder for Egyptian Premier League club ENPPI.

Club career

Vojvodina
Meleg made his professional debut with FK Vojvodina in a 0–3 loss against FK Partizan on September 29, 2012 at the age of 17. He was invited by Ajax to pass medical tests in Amsterdam as a precondition to signing with the Dutch powerhouse; the transfer, however, was up in the air as of December 19, 2012 since FK Vojvodina's president Ratko Butorović had a rift with the Swiss agency which has a certain share in Meleg's professional contract.

Ajax
On January 16, 2013, Dutch media began reporting an agreement had been reached between Ajax and FK Vojvodina and Meleg signing a contract until 2016. Just a week later, on January 23, 2013, it was finally announced by FK Vojvodina that Meleg signed for Ajax. He made his debut for Ajax on 29 June 2013 in a 2013–14 pre-season friendly encounter against SDC Putten. Meleg scored the opening goal in the 17' minute to help Ajax to a 1–4 victory at the Sportpark Puttereng in Putten.

Starting the 2013/14 season, left footed Dejan Meleg was enlisted with the reserves team Jong Ajax, who were newly promoted to the Dutch Eerste Divisie the second tier of professional football in the Netherlands. He made his debut on 16 August 2013 in a 1–0 loss to MVV Maastricht. On 3 September 2013 he scored both his first and second professional goal in the Netherlands playing for Jong Ajax against Jong PSV in a 4–2 away win.

On 21 December 2015, 6 months before expiration, Ajax and Meleg reached an agreement for mutual termination of contract.

SC Cambuur
On 10 July 2014, it was announced that Meleg would be sent on loan to SC Cambuur until the end of the season. He made his Eredivisie debut on 9 August 2014 in a 1–1 draw against FC Twente at home. He made his first appearance in the Dutch Cup on 24 September 2014 in a 4–0 away win against FC Den Bosch. On 6 March 2015 it was announced that Meleg's loan spell was terminated with immediate effect, seeing Meleg return to Amsterdam, having fallen out of favor in Leeuwarden.

Return to Vojvodina
On 2 January 2016, Dejan re-signed for Vojvodina until June 2018.

Kayserispor
On 28 June 2017, Meleg signed for Turkish side Kayserispor.

Red Star Belgrade
On 12 June 2018, Meleg signed for Red Star Belgrade on a 3-year deal. However, he was loaned out to Levadiakos and Radnički Niš.

Borac Banja Luka
In October 2020, he joined Borac Banja Luka.

ENPPI
In September 2022, he transferred to Egyptian club ENPPI.

International career
Meleg has represented Serbia on various youth levels and currently plays for Serbia U19. He played for the Serbia U19 side that won the 2013 UEFA European Under-19 Championship.

Honours
Serbia U19
UEFA European Under-19 Football Championship (1): 2013

Borac Banja Luka
Bosnian Premier League: 2020–21

References

External links

1994 births
Living people
People from Bački Jarak
Serbian footballers
Serbia youth international footballers
Serbia under-21 international footballers
Serbian expatriate footballers
FK Vojvodina players
AFC Ajax players
Jong Ajax players
SC Cambuur players
Kayserispor footballers
Red Star Belgrade footballers
Levadiakos F.C. players
FK Radnički Niš players
FK Borac Banja Luka players
ENPPI SC players
Serbian SuperLiga players
Eredivisie players
Eerste Divisie players
Süper Lig players
Super League Greece players
Premier League of Bosnia and Herzegovina players
Egyptian Premier League players
Association football midfielders
Serbian expatriate sportspeople in the Netherlands
Serbian expatriate sportspeople in Turkey
Serbian expatriate sportspeople in Greece
Serbian expatriate sportspeople in Bosnia and Herzegovina
Serbian expatriate sportspeople in Egypt
Expatriate footballers in the Netherlands
Expatriate footballers in Turkey
Expatriate footballers in Greece
Expatriate footballers in Bosnia and Herzegovina
Expatriate footballers in Egypt